ZVL Leiden is a water polo club in Leiden established for girls and women. The club was founded in 2004 by three local clubs. The name represents the first letters of these clubs: Zijl-LGB, |Vivax en LZ 1886. The crest colors are red and blue.

Honorary list

National 
Dutch Champion
2013-2014, 2015-2016
Super Cup
2012-2013,2013-2014, 2015-2016
KNZB beker 5x
2011-2012, 2012-2013, 2013-2014  2014-2015 2015-2016 
KNZB Beker 2 (ManMeer!-Cup)
2006-2007, 2012-2013, 2013-2014, 2014-2015

International 
Champions Cup
Final Four: 2007-2008
LEN Trophy
Quarter Finals: 2010-2011, 2011–2012, 2012–2013

Players 
Iefke van Belkum
Jantien Cabout
Mieke Cabout
Biurakn Hakhverdian
Anne Heinis
Noeki Klein
Ilse Koolhaas
Kitty Lynn Joustra

References

Water polo clubs in the Netherlands
LEN Women's Champions' Cup clubs
Sports clubs in Leiden
2004 establishments in the Netherlands
Sports clubs established in 2004